Hadj Habib Derbouz Draoua (1914 – ), commonly known as Habib Draoua and also called Hadj Draoua was a professional Algerian footballer who played as a midfielder. He was also a manager.

Life and career
Habib Draoua was born in Mdina Jdida in the city of Oran in 1914. Very young, he joined USM Oran which was then the greatest Algerian Muslim club, where he did all his youth classes. He played his first senior match at the age of 20 in 1934. In 1937 he joined Le Havre AC, he remained in France until 1945 and the end of the Second World War. In 1945, he joined Tunisia as a coach-player at ES Tunis before being transferred to the CS Hammam Lif where he won two Tunisian Cups in 1951 and 1954. He stopped his football career in 1950, after winning two Tunisian championship titles in 1957 and in 1960 with the Stade Tunisien.

In 1957, he participated for the creation of the Algerian National Liberation Army football team (ALN Football Team) which resulted a year later in the creation of the FLN football team. He prepared tours, such as those of Syria, Iraq and Jordan.

He was a national ma,ager of Tunisia national team from 1957 to 1960. He was thanked and honored in 1960 with a "Silver Medal" by the Tunisian Football Federation and the Ministry of Sports of Tunisia for the services rendered to Tunisian football.
He returned to Algeria after independence in 1962, and coached the two greatest clubs of the city of Oran, MC Oran and ASM Oran during the 1960s, 1970s and 1980s.

Honours

Player
USM Oran
Oran Championship: 1935
North African Championship: Runners-up: 1935

Le Havre AC
French Division 2: 1938

Coach
CS Hammam-Lif
Tunisian National Championship: 1951, 1954, 1955, 1956
Tunisian Cup: 1951, 1954, 1955

Tunisia
Pan Arab Games: Runners-up: 1957

Individual
Silver Medal: by the FTF and the Ministry of Sports of Tunisia: 1960

References

External links
Player profile - leballonrond.fr''

1914 births
2008 deaths
Algerian expatriate footballers
Algerian emigrants to France
Expatriate football managers in Tunisia
French footballers
Algerian footballers
USM Oran players
Le Havre AC players
Espérance Sportive de Tunis players
Stade Tunisien players
Ligue 1 players
Tunisian Ligue Professionnelle 1 players
Tunisia national football team managers
Espérance Sportive de Tunis managers
CS Hammam-Lif managers
Stade Tunisien managers
MC Oran managers
ASM Oran managers
Footballers from Oran
Algerian football managers
Algeria national football team managers
Association football midfielders